The Christian community  in Qatar is a diverse mix of European, North and South American, Asian, Middle Eastern and African expatriates. They form around 13.8% of the total population (2010). Many of them are from South India. Most Christians in Qatar are not Arab Christians. The constitution provides for religious liberty. Proselytizing by non-Muslims is prohibited by law. No foreign missionary groups operate openly in the country. Religious groups must register with the Government for legal recognition.

History
Many of the inhabitants of Qatar were introduced to Christianity after the religion was dispersed eastward by Mesopotamian Christians from 224 AD onwards. Monasteries were constructed in Qatar during this era. During the latter part of the Christian era, Qatar was known by the Syriac name 'Beth Qatraye'. A variant of this was 'Beth Catara'. The name translates to 'region of the Qataris'. The region was not limited to Qatar; it also included Bahrain, Tarout Island, Al-Khatt, and Al-Hasa. In the fifth century AD, Beth Qatraye was the main center of the Nestorian Christian Church of the East, which ruled the southern shores of the Persian Gulf. The Nestorians were often persecuted for being viewed as heretics by the Byzantine Empire, but Eastern Arabia was outside the control of the Byzantine Empire and the region provided some security. In 628, most of the Arab tribes converted to Islam.

It is likely that some settled populations in Qatar did not immediately convert to Islam. Isaac of Nineveh, a 7th-century Syriac Christian bishop regarded as a saint in some churches, was born in Qatar. Other notable Christian scholars dating to this period who hailed from the Qatari Peninsula include Dadisho Qatraya, Gabriel of Qatar and Ahob of Qatar. In 674, the bishops of Beth Qatraye stopped attending synods; although the practice of Christianity persisted in the region until the late 9th century.

Religious Complex, Doha
In May 2005, representatives of Christian churches in Qatar signed an agreement with the Qatari Government for a fifty-year lease on a large piece of property in Mesaimeer on the outskirts of Doha on which they intended to erect six churches at their own expense. The churches were expected to pay nominal lease fees of a few hundred dollars a year, renewable after ten years. The property was expected to include an Anglican church that may also be used by other Protestant denominations, a church to serve thirty four Indian-Christian congregations, a church for the country's small but influential Coptic community, and a site for two Orthodox churches, one Greek and one Eastern Rite.

In December 2005, the foundation stone for the Catholic Church was laid and the ground-breaking took place at the end of April 2006.  A board composed of members of all the Christian churches liaises directly with the Ministry of Foreign Affairs regarding church matters. Each church has been granted permission to apply for visas for visiting clerics to preside over and assist in church services. Previously, Catholics and other Christians were limited to informal group meetings in homes.

The Anglican Church of the Epiphany,  was officially opened on 21 September 2013 and consecrated on 28 September 2013. The church sanctuary can accommodate up to 650 worshipers. The Anglican Centre, managed by the Anglican Church in Qatar, accommodates 59 additional Evangelical, Pentecostal and Protestant congregations.

The St. Issac and St. George Greek Orthodox Church serves the orthodox communities numbering about 10,000 people from the Middle East, Asia, Syria and Africa.

Denominations
Among the denominations mentioned in World Christian Encyclopedia, second edition, Volume 1, p. 617-618 are the Catholic Church, Coptic Church, Mar Thoma Syrian Church originally from India, Arab Evangelical Church, Christian Brethren, Pentecostals and Anglican Church. Protestantism in Qatar forms a minority among Christians in Qatar. 

The Coptic minority in Qatar is substantial; they have a renovated church, St. Paul & St. Peter Coptic Orthodox Church at the Religious Complex in Qatar. Qatar's Anglican population is estimated at 7,000 to 10,000 persons. 

There are about 200,000 Catholics in Qatar., who are under the jurisdiction of the Apostolic Vicariate of Northern Arabia. 
In 2008, the first Catholic Church in Qatar in 14 centuries, Catholic Church of Our Lady of the Rosary, was opened in Doha.

See also
 Catholic Church in Qatar
 Protestantism in Qatar
 Christianity in the Middle East
 Christianity in Eastern Arabia

References

World Christian Encyclopedia, Second edition, Volume 1, p. 617

External links
THE OFFICIAL RESPONSE OF HIS BEATITUDE THEOPHILOS III OF JERUSALEM TO HIS BEATITUDE JOHN X OF ANTIOCH CONCERNING THE CANONICAL JURISDICTION OF THE EMIRATE OF QATAR
 Metropolitan Saba Esber Responds to the Patriarchate of Jerusalem's Statement